The Exotic Feline Rescue Center (EFRC) is an American exotic feline preserve established in 1991 and located in Center Point, Indiana.

Overview
The EFRC is a 501(c)(3) tax-exempt charitable organization. It cares for ten exotic feline species, including lions, tigers, leopards, servals, pumas, bobcats, Canada lynx, ocelots, Geoffroy's cat and an Asian leopard cat. The EFRC is the second largest big cat rescue center in the United States providing a permanent home for non-domestic cats that have been abused, abandoned, or lack habitation for other reasons. The EFRC does not buy, sell, or breed animals. Veterinary care is available from an site clinic and the organization provides education to the public.

The EFRC is the focus of several books published by Indiana University Press, including Saving the Big Cats (2006) and Tails From the Exotic Feline Rescue Center (2016).

The EFRC was prominently featured in the 2009 movie The Tiger Next Door and was the subject of a TV documentary in 2009.

Research
Over a two-year period (2008-2009), Dr. Susan Linville at the Center for the Integrative Study of Animal Behavior (CISAB)  and Dr. Helena Sioni at the Institute for Pheromone Research, both located at Indiana University, conducted a research project with lions, tigers, cougars and leopards at the EFRC to study rubbing behavior and determine whether a pheromone was being deposited during rubbing.

In 2009, a research project was conducted by several veterinarians from the University of Illinois Urbana-Champaign, College of Veterinary Medicine.  Under the direction of Dr. Stuart Clark-Price, immobilization and anesthesia methods for tigers were assessed in order to optimize current protocols and maximize animal safety under anesthesia. During these procedures, veterinary ophthalmologists gathered routine measurements on the tigers' eyes to determine what is normal in this species. Collected information was to be used to improve current therapies and establish a basis for the treatment of eye disease in tigers. Any Dental examinations were also performed by The Peter Emily International Veterinary Dental Foundation to determine the current condition of each tiger’s teeth and the potential need for future dental care. Any needed dental treatments were performed by board-certified veterinary dentists pro bono. Other information, including normal blood values and anti-body levels of different diseases, was evaluated to improve the care of these tigers as well as global care for the species.

Internships
The EFRC offers internships for college students and credit is offered for students at Indiana University through the Center for Integrative Study of Animal Behavior.

Staff
Director: Joe Taft
Assistant director: Jean Herrberg
Head keeper: Rebecca Rizzo

Incidents
On June 21, 2013, a tiger mauled a caretaker who was cleaning its cage, clamping the woman's head in its mouth during the attack. The unidentified 21-year-old woman was airlifted to Wishard Memorial Hospital and was in critical but non-life-threatening condition. As a result of the incident, the Indiana Occupational Safety and Health Administration conducted an inspection and in November 2013 fined the center $56,000 for "knowing" violations and $13,000 for "serious" violations, including dangerous conditions likely to cause death or physical harm to employees. Three days after the incident, Ann Marie Houser, an animal care inspector from the USDA, visited the center to investigate. Houser noticed an issue with the enclosure door, a 4-to-6-inch gap, which the facility benefactor, Taft, had attempted to fix with the use of a piece of rebar. It was Houser's finding that this repair prohibited the cage from functioning efficiently or quickly in an emergency.

References

External links

Non-profit organizations based in Indiana
Landmarks in Indiana
Tourist attractions in Indiana
1991 establishments in Indiana